Selmore is an unincorporated community in Christian County, in the U.S. state of Missouri.

History
A post office called Selmore was established in 1892, and remained in operation until 1915. According to tradition, the community was named for a local merchant's vow to "sell more" wares than his competitor.

References

Unincorporated communities in Christian County, Missouri
Unincorporated communities in Missouri